Gugarchin (also Romanized as Gūgarchīn; also known as Govarchīn, Gūvarchin, and Kuvarchin) is a village in Mavazekhan-e Sharqi Rural District, Khvajeh District, Heris County, East Azerbaijan Province, Iran. At the 2006 census, its population was 28, in 10 families.

References 

Populated places in Heris County